Ragnhild Elisabeth Larsen (later Huth, 16 March 1900 – 12 November 1969) was a Norwegian diver who competed in the 1920 Summer Olympics. She was born and died in Oslo. In 1920 she was eliminated in the first round of the 10 metre platform competition.

References

External links
profile

1900 births
1969 deaths
Norwegian female divers
Olympic divers of Norway
Divers at the 1920 Summer Olympics
Sportspeople from Oslo